Roeboexodon is a genus of characins from tropical South America, with two currently recognized species:
 Roeboexodon geryi G. S. Myers, 1960
 Roeboexodon guyanensis (Puyo, 1948)

References

Characidae
Fish of South America